Sergei Sergeyevich Kharlamov (born 22 June 1973) is a Russian former professional football player.

Career
Kharlamov captained FC Rubin Kazan from 1999 to 2004.

Fraud conviction
After he retired from playing football, Kharlamov was involved in marketing investments for a Kazan-based credit production company, Rost, which the Republic of Tatarstan Interior Ministry determined to be an illegal financial pyramid scheme. The Ministry charged Kharlamov with participating in the defrauding of 3,500 investors from December 2013 to March 2015.

On 30 July 2020, prosecutors at trial requested a sentence of 16.5 years of imprisonment.

On 13 November 2020, he was sentenced to 12 years of imprisonment for fraud.

Honours
 Russian Premier League bronze: 2003.

References

External links
 

1973 births
Sportspeople from Kazan
Living people
Soviet footballers
Russian footballers
Association football defenders
FC Rubin Kazan players
FC Neftekhimik Nizhnekamsk players
Russian Premier League players